Orel is a municipality and village in Chrudim District in the Pardubice Region of the Czech Republic. It has about 800 inhabitants.

Administrative parts
The village of Tři Bubny is an administrative part of Orel.

References

External links

Villages in Chrudim District